Kevin Müller may refer to:

 Kevin Müller (canoeist) (born 1988), German canoer
 Kevin Müller (footballer) (born 1991), German footballer
 Kevin Muller (footballer) (born 1987), Puerto Rican soccer player